Glasgow Queen Street is a passenger railway terminus serving the city centre of Glasgow, Scotland. It is the smaller of the city's two mainline railway terminals (the larger being Glasgow Central) and is the third busiest station in Scotland behind Central and Edinburgh Waverley. 

It connects Glasgow with Edinburgh, the capital of Scotland, via the Glasgow–Edinburgh via Falkirk line and the North Clyde Line. Other significant connections include the West Highland Line for services to and from the Scottish Highlands, the Highland Main Line and Glasgow–Dundee line. The station is split into two levels with high level trains predominantly serving the Edinburgh shuttle and further afield destinations, while the low level platforms serve trains covering the Central Belt of Scotland.  

The station is located between George Street to the south and Cathedral Street Bridge to the north and is at the northern end of Queen Street adjacent to George Square, Glasgow's major civic square. It is also a short walk from Buchanan Street, Glasgow's main shopping district and the location of Buchanan Street subway station, the closest connection to Queen Street for the Glasgow Subway network. 

The station underwent major redevelopment works by Network Rail in the late 2010s. In October 2017, a £120 million project began on bringing the station up to modern standards, demolishing many of the 1960s buildings and replacing them with a new station concourse, which was completed in 2021. It is also anticipated that Network Rail will take over day to day management of the station in 2022.

History

The station was built by the Edinburgh and Glasgow Railway, and opened on 21 February 1842 as Dundas Street Station before being renamed as Queen Street. Despite opening in 1842, the train shed (curved glass roof) wasn't completed until 1878, over three decades later. In 1865 the E&GR was absorbed into the North British Railway, in 1878 the entire station was redesigned by the civil engineer James Carswell. Carswell introduced electric lighting at the station, which was one of the earliest examples of electricity use in Glasgow. It became part of the LNER group in 1923.

The climb through the tunnel to Cowlairs is at 1 in 42 and until 1909 trains were hauled up on a rope operated by a stationary engine, although experiments were carried out using banking engines in 1844–48. Three people died in 1928 when a train leaving the station rolled back into another train. Modern diesel and electric trains have no difficulty with the climb.

The adjacent  station of the rival Caledonian Railway closed on 7 November 1966 as a result of the Beeching cuts and its services to Stirling, Perth, Inverness, Dundee and Aberdeen transferred to Queen Street. This caused difficulties with longer trains, as Queen Street is in a confined position between George Square and the tunnel. Buchanan Street was demolished the following year in 1967.

In the 1980s, HSTs were used on Cross Country and East Coast services run by InterCity, having to use Platform 7 with the end of the train being close to the tunnel mouth.

Minor refurbishments of the station took place throughout the 2000s, which saw the station internally repainted and paved with new flooring, and the CRT screens that displayed train timetables and passenger information replaced with new LED information boards similar to those in Glasgow Central Station but smaller, in January 2008. The station received new Eco LED screens provided by Infotec Displays in 2020.

In 2009, the Scottish Government announced that the Glasgow to Edinburgh via Falkirk Line would be electrified by 2017. Overhead line electrification lines have been installed on the high level platforms of Queen Street, with Class 380 trains now operating from the station as of December 2017, and Class 385 trains as of Autumn 2018. As part of this work, the High Level station was closed for 20 weeks (from 20 March to 8 August 2016) to allow  of track in Queen Street Tunnel (and all of the tracks and platforms in the station itself) to be replaced. Services were diverted over various routes during this period, with some trains running to/from the Low Level station and others to/from Glasgow Central station (via Cumbernauld, Coatbridge and Carmyle).

Expansion 

In August 2006 Network Rail revealed that it intended to redevelop Queen Street substantially, making use of the Hanover Street car park area to provide more retail space, and to upgrade the station's entrances and to provide escalators down to the lower-level platforms. More plans were unveiled in September 2011 by Network Rail, along with an announcement that the owner of the Buchanan Galleries shopping mall – Land Securities had been chosen as development partner for the station alongside Henderson Group. This saw the 1970s hotel extension (which until recently fronted the George Square entrance of the station) demolished and replaced by a glass atrium. The previous plans of developing the airspace rights above the North Hanover Street car park into an expanded retail and restaurant area will be carried forward – and will form part of the proposed extension to the Buchanan Galleries, which will gain direct access to the station concourse. 

In August 2017, work began on the £120 million redevelopment of the station, which at the time was expected to be completed by December 2019, but was pushed back until 2020 due to delays in receiving power to go forward with the work. Platforms 2 through 5 were subsequently extended in 2019 to accommodate longer trains introduced as part of the Edinburgh to Glasgow Improvement Programme (EGIP). Demolition of surrounding buildings was completed in October 2018 to accommodate the lengthened platforms and expanded concourse. 

Following demolition of the surrounding Consort House buildings, the original Victorian era train shed (the large curved glass roof of the station) was uncovered after more than 40 years. The shed is a Category A Listed Structure, and subsequently work on the station was undertaken with care to integrate the historic structure into its new surroundings.

The work was officially completed on 4 October 2021. This also marks the end of EGIP.

In May 2021, a planning proposal was submitted to add a new plaza and mezzanine on the North Hanover Street side of the station. , the decision is still pending.

Services
Queen Street station's platforms are on two levels, with the high-level platforms running directly north–south and the low-level running east–west. They are connected by staircases at either end of the low-level platforms and by lifts accessible from platform 7 on the high level. All services except the Caledonian Sleeper are operated by Scotrail. 

As of December 2022, the off-peak Monday to Friday service in trains per hour (tph) or trains per day (tpd) is: 

High-Level: 

 2 tph to Edinburgh Waverley via Croy and Falkirk High (Scotrail Express)
 1 tph to Cumbernauld via Springburn
 1 tph to Falkirk Grahamston via Springburn and Cumbernauld
 1 tph to Anniesland via Maryhill
 6 tpd to Oban via Crianlarich and Dalmally
 4 tpd to Mallaig via Crianlarich and Fort William
 2 tph to Alloa via Croy and Stirling
 1 tph to Aberdeen via Stirling, Perth and Dundee
 1 tph to Dundee via Stirling and Perth
 5 tpd to Inverness via Stirling, Perth and Aviemore

Low-Level: 
 2 tph to Edinburgh Waverley via Airdrie and Bathgate
 2 tph to Helensburgh Central via Hyndland and Dumbarton Central
 2 tph to Balloch via Singer and Dumbarton Central
 2 tph to Airdrie via Bellgrove and Coatbridge Sunnyside
 2 tph to Milngavie via Anniesland and Hillfoot
 2 tph to Springburn via Bellgrove and Barnhill
 1 tpd (except Saturday night) to London Euston via Edinburgh Waverley and Preston (Caledonian Sleeper)
 1 tpd (except Saturday night) to Fort William via Crianlarich (Caledonian Sleeper)

High level

The High Level station is the larger of the two levels; it is the terminus for the Edinburgh shuttles and all routes north of the Central Belt run by ScotRail.  The high level railway approaches the station building through the Queen Street Tunnel, which runs beneath the Buchanan Galleries shopping centre to the Sighthill area north-east of the city centre. Platforms 1–7 occupy the High Level, platform 1 being at the western end of the trainshed and being considerably shorter; it is usually only used for local stopping services. Since the electrification of several of the routes from the High level station (Edinburgh to Glasgow, via Falkirk High, and to Stirling, Dunblane and Alloa), the fleet is largely electric, using the new Class 385 trains.

Low level

Platforms 8 and 9 comprise the Low Level station and it is the most central stop on the North Clyde Line of the Glasgow suburban electric network. Trains run frequently between Helensburgh on the Firth of Clyde, Balloch and suburban Milngavie to Airdrie, on the eastern edge of the Greater Glasgow conurbation and onward to Edinburgh via Bathgate and Livingston. The line is electrified; the fleet operating this route are Class 318s, Class 320s and Class 334s.

Services on the West Highland Line to Oban, Fort William and Mallaig occasionally use the Low Level station when the main route into the High Level is unavailable due to engineering work.

The Low Level line between High Street, Queen Street and Charing Cross was built before the Glasgow Subway, making it the oldest underground railway in the city. In May–June 2014, work was carried out to redevelop the Low Level platforms, which now have new compliant seating.

Signalling

Queen Street signal box, opened in 1881, was on a gantry spanning the tracks close to the tunnel mouth. It closed on 26 February 1967 when control of the high level station was transferred to a panel in Cowlairs signal box. That box was superseded by the new Cowlairs signalling centre on 28 December 1998.  This in turn was abolished in October 2013 and the station is now under the supervision of Edinburgh IECC (which will eventually become the Edinburgh Rail Operating Centre).

The low level station had two signal boxes, 'Queen Street West' and 'Queen Street East'. Both boxes were over the tracks and closed on 8 February 1960. The low level lines came under the control of Yoker Signalling Centre (IECC) on 19 November 1989.

Proposals

Various schemes to link Queen Street to  station have been considered, as passengers travelling from the north of Scotland to the south and vice versa via Glasgow have to traverse the city centre either on foot or by road.  A bus link connects the two stations (which also calls at the city's Buchanan bus station), use of which is free to rail passengers making a cross-Glasgow transfer on a through ticket. Neither of Glasgow's main line terminals is directly served by the Glasgow Subway, although a moving walkway was installed between Queen Street and the immediately adjacent  subway station during the system's modernisation in 1980. Planned expansion work of Buchanan Galleries Shopping Centre is expected to "subtly envelope" the Subway connection to redevelop the neglected Dundas Street.

One option to allow cross-Glasgow rail journeys would be Crossrail Glasgow, using a former passenger line (now used only for freight) that links High Street to the Gorbals area. This initiative was reviewed favourably, but progress has been stalled indefinitely as of 2009. Alternative proposals envisage a new city centre station (possibly in a tunnel underneath the city centre) or a light rail / metro system.

The Glasgow Connectivity Commission, established by the Glasgow City Council in 2017, has proposed the construction of a cross-city centre tunnel akin to the Stockholm City Line to connect the two termini. If the plans are approved, a new intermediate underground station will also be built.

Routes – past and present

References

Other sources

 
 
 
 Glasgow and District Transport Plans – 1951 with details of Queen Street and proposed new station

Railway stations in Glasgow
Former North British Railway stations
Railway stations in Great Britain opened in 1842 
Railway stations in Great Britain opened in 1886 
Railway stations served by ScotRail
Railway stations served by Caledonian Sleeper
SPT railway stations
Category A listed buildings in Glasgow
Listed railway stations in Scotland
1842 establishments in Scotland